Druciatus is a genus of flies belonging to the family Lesser Dung flies.

Species
D. angustus Marshall in Marshall & Totton, 1995
D. campbelli Marshall in Marshall & Totton, 1995
D. dissidens Marshall in Marshall & Totton, 1995
D. latisternus Marshall in Marshall & Totton, 1995
D. nigritarsus Marshall in Marshall & Totton, 1995
D. ovisternus Marshall, 1995
D. petilus Marshall in Marshall & Totton, 1995
D. trisetus Marshall in Marshall & Totton, 1995

References

Sphaeroceridae
Diptera of South America
Schizophora genera